Yadkin College is a census-designated place (CDP) in rural Davidson County, North Carolina, United States, located 9 miles (14 km) northwest of Lexington.  Contrary to its name, it is not part of Yadkin County.

Yadkin College is named for the college of the same name that operated there from 1857 to 1895, which was in turn named after the Yadkin River that runs alongside the village.

The Yadkin College Historic District was added to the National Register of Historic Places in 1988.

The latitude of Yadkin College is 35.872N. The longitude is -80.375W.  The ZIP code is 27295.

It first appeared as a CDP in the 2020 Census with a population of 377.

Demographics

2020 census

Note: the US Census treats Hispanic/Latino as an ethnic category. This table excludes Latinos from the racial categories and assigns them to a separate category. Hispanics/Latinos can be of any race.

References

 Fick, Virginia G. Country College on the Yadkin: A Historical Narrative. Winston-Salem, NC: Hunter Publishing, c1984.

External links
 Davidson County Government
 City Data: Yadkin College

Census-designated places in Davidson County, North Carolina
Census-designated places in North Carolina